Hamburg-Neugraben or Neugraben railway station is situated in Neugraben-Fischbek, which is a quarter on the south-western border of Hamburg in north-western Germany. It serves frequent S-Bahn (mass-transit) trains between Pinneberg and Stade (S3 line) and between Hamburg-Altona station and Neugraben station (S31 service).

Until January 2008, Neugraben station was the southern terminus of the S3 service. In January 2008 the S-Bahn track to Stade via Neu Wulmstorf and Buxtehude was completed and through services were added to the timetable. However, there are considerably fewer trains going to Buxtehude and/or Stade than finishing in Neugraben.

Station layout 
The station is an at-grade station with 5 tracks—including 3 for the Hamburg S-Bahn—and 2 island platforms and a side platform. Parking is available via park and ride.

Service  
Rail service at Hamburg-Neugraben station:

See also  

 Hamburger Verkehrsverbund (HVV)
 List of Hamburg S-Bahn stations

References

External links

Neugraben
Neugraben
Buildings and structures in Harburg, Hamburg
Hamburg Neugraben
Hamburg Neugraben